Adriano Tilgher (born 1 October 1947 in Taranto) is an Italian far-right politician.

Biography
Tilgher began his career as a member of the neo-fascist Italian Social Movement, although in his youth he was also associated with the neo-fascist extremist National Vanguard, and attempted to refound it in 1970. He was given a prison sentence for what was judged an attempt to refound the Fascist Party. In the late 1970s Tilgher directed a transnational neofascist magazine entitled Confidentiel in Rome. It was founded by Stefano Delle Chiaie in Paris in 1979.

In 1987 he founded the Lega Nazionalpopolare, later rebranded as Alternativa Nazional Popolare. Both movements proved short-lived and lacking in support.

After giving up on the idea of leading his own movement he joined radical Fiamma Tricolore (a splinter group of the newly constituted National Alliance) in 1996. He was, however, expelled from Fiamma Tricolore in 1997 for his criticism of the leadership of Pino Rauti and in September of that year he set up his own party, Fronte Nazionale, initially in imitation of the Front National, whose leader Jean-Marie Le Pen Tilgher invited to Rome during the elections of that year. The party changed its name to Fronte Sociale Nazionale and was part of Alessandra Mussolini's Alternativa Sociale coalition until that group dissolved after a poor showing in the 2006 general election. He subsequently formed an alliance with The Right in 2008.

In 1994 Tilgher and Stefano Delle Chiaie co-authored a book with him entitled Un meccanismo diabolico: Stragi Servizi segreti Magistrati. The book dealt with what the authors claimed has been their victimisation by the Italian legal system.

External links
 Official site

References

1947 births
Italian neo-fascists
Living people
National Front (Italy, 1997) politicians
The Right (Italy) politicians
Tricolour Flame politicians